Demetri Kareem Mitchell (born 11 January 1997) is an English professional footballer who plays as a left-back or as a winger for EFL League One club Exeter City.

Mitchell is a graduate of the Manchester United youth system and won the Denzil Haroun Reserve Player of the Year award in 2018. He made a single senior appearance for the club, in a Premier League game in May 2017, and had two spells on loan at Scottish club Hearts. In September 2020, shortly after being released by United, he joined Blackpool. In January 2022, he joined Hibernian for an undisclosed fee.

Mitchell represented England at under-16, under-17, under-18 and under-20 levels. He was a member of the under-17 squad which won the 2014 UEFA European Under-17 Football Championship.

Club career

Manchester United

Early career
Mitchell started his youth career with Fletcher Moss Rangers; the same academy where teammates Cameron Borthwick-Jackson and Marcus Rashford also started their careers. He joined United in 2013, and was originally deployed as a winger for their youth teams. However, after Borthwick-Jackson was loaned to Wolverhampton Wanderers for the 2016–17 season, Mitchell was converted to a left-back in his absence.

Mitchell was called up to the Manchester United senior squad on 7 May 2017, training with the first team ahead of a Premier League clash with rivals Arsenal, but was not named in the 18-man matchday squad. A week later, he was named among the substitutes in a 2–1 defeat by Tottenham Hotspur, but again did not feature. He made his senior debut in the final game of the season, starting against Crystal Palace. The following season, Mitchell played in thirteen Premier League 2 fixtures, before going out on loan to Hearts.

Loan to Hearts
On 11 January 2018, Mitchell was loaned to Scottish Premiership side Hearts until the end of the season. He joined up with the squad at their winter training camp in Valencia. Mitchell made his debut for Hearts on 21 January 2018, playing from the start in a 1–0 win over Edinburgh Derby rivals Hibernian at Tynecastle Park, in the fourth round of the Scottish Cup, winning the man of the match award. Mitchell scored the first senior goal of his career in Hearts' subsequent Scottish Cup tie, a 3–0 fifth round home win over St Johnstone. In March, Mitchell returned to United for treatment for an injury to his meniscus tendon and was ruled out until the end of the season. He had first picked up the injury during a match against Ross County in February. Ultimately, he returned to training earlier than expected, playing in two further matches. In all, Mitchell made 11 appearances for Hearts in this spell, scoring once in all competitions.

Second loan to Hearts
Mitchell returned to United for their preseason tour of America in July 2018, and subsequently signed a new contract with the club until 2020.

On 28 August 2018, Mitchell was once again loaned to Hearts, this time on a season long loan. On his return, Mitchell stated that he felt he had "unfinished business" at Hearts due to his previous injury. In February 2019, he suffered a recurrence of the injury in a Scottish Cup game against Auchinleck Talbot, and was ruled out for the rest of the season after undergoing an operation.

Recovery from injury
Mitchell returned to training at Manchester United in September 2019, as he continued his recovery from the injury. In June 2020, Manchester United announced that Mitchell would be leaving the club upon the expiration of his contract.

Blackpool
In August 2020, after spending time training with Sunderland, Mitchell joined fellow EFL League One club Blackpool on trial. On 4 September 2020, Blackpool announced that Mitchell had signed a two-year contract with the club, with an option to extend the deal by a further year.

Hibernian
Mitchell joined Scottish club Hibernian for an undisclosed fee on 24 January 2022.
On 29 January 2022, Mitchell scored in his first start for Hibernian, in a 3–2 defeat to Livingston.

Exeter City
On 26 January 2023, Mitchell signed for Exeter City on a free transfer.

International career
Mitchell has represented England at under-16, under-17, under-18 and under-20 levels. He was a member of the England under-17 squad which won the 2014 UEFA European Under-17 Football Championship. He also won the 2017 Toulon Tournament, starting in the final against Ivory Coast.

In January 2022 Mitchell said that he hoped to represent Jamaica, where his grandparents were born.

Career statistics

Honours
England U17
UEFA European Under-17 Football Championship: 2014

England U20
Toulon Tournament: 2017

Individual
Denzil Haroun Reserve Player of the Year: 2017–18

References

External links
Profile  at the Football Association website
Demetri Mitchell – Soccerbase

1997 births
Living people
Footballers from Manchester
Association football defenders
English footballers
England youth international footballers
Manchester United F.C. players
Heart of Midlothian F.C. players
Blackpool F.C. players
Hibernian F.C. players
Premier League players
Scottish Professional Football League players
Fletcher Moss Rangers F.C. players
English people of Jamaican descent
English Football League players
Exeter City F.C. players